The 2008 North Carolina Tar Heels football team represented the University of North Carolina at Chapel Hill as a member of Coastal Division of the Atlantic Coast Conference (ACC) during the 2008 NCAA Division I FBS football season. Led by second-year head coach Butch Davis, the Tar Heels played their home games at Kenan Memorial Stadium in Chapel Hill, North Carolina. North Carolina finished the season 8–5 overall and 4–4 in ACC play to tie for third in the Coastal Division. The Tar Heels lost to West Virginia in the Meineke Car Care Bowl. In 2011, North Carolina vacated all its wins from the 2008 and 2009 seasons.

Recruiting
The Tar Heels received 16 letters of intent on National Signing Day, February 6, 2008. One student athlete had already enrolled before National Signing Day and one signed several days later, making this class smaller and less-heralded than the previous year's class.

Coaching staff
After signing a contract extension at the end of the 2007 season, Butch Davis enters his second season as head coach.  Chuck Pagano resigned as defensive coordinator and defensive backs coach to become an assistant coach with the Baltimore Ravens in the NFL. He was replaced by Minnesota assistant  Everett Withers.

 Brad Davis (Graduate Assistant)

Roster

Schedule

Game summaries

McNeese State

Brandon Tate put on a dazzling one-man show, scoring on an 82-yard punt return and putting North Carolina ahead for good with a 57-yard touchdown catch to help the Tar Heels hold off McNeese State 35-27. Tate finished with a school-record 397 all-purpose yards for the Tar Heels, who showed little else in an unimpressive start to their second season under Butch Davis. In a game suspended nearly two hours due to weather, they blew a 14-0 first-half lead and had to rally from a third-quarter deficit against Football Championship Subdivision McNeese State, who outplayed the Heels much of the way. T. J. Yates had 221 passing yards and 2 touchdowns.

Rutgers

T. J. Yates threw three touchdown passes and the Tar Heels won for the first time outside North Carolina since 2002, beating error-prone Rutgers 44-12 in a nationally televised game that pitted Butch Davis against his former pupil, Greg Schiano. Hakeem Nicks and Brandon Tate combined for 10 catches, 204 receiving yards, and three touchdowns as the Heels offense rolled over Rutgers. Carolina's defense generated 4 Rutgers turnovers (3 INTs and a fumble) and scored off of a 66-yard interception return by Bruce Carter.

References

North Carolina
North Carolina Tar Heels football seasons
North Carolina Tar Heels football